Louis Rey may refer to:

 Louis Emmanuel Rey (1768–1846), French army general
 Louis Rey (architect), French architect